Pakhus 48 is a former warehouse of the Free Port of Copenhagen, Denmark, now housing showrooms for a number of design and furniture companies. Owned by Copenhagen City and Port, the building has an area of 3,000 square metres.

Companies
Companies with showrooms in the building are:
 Fritz Hansen
 Kvadrat
 Erik Jørgensen
 Grid
 VOLA
 Montana
 Luceplan

References

External links
 Official website

Nordhavn, Copenhagen
Warehouses in Copenhagen
Danish design